This article is a list of American football players who have played for the National Football League (NFL)'s New York Giants.  It includes players that have played one or more games for the Giants in the NFL regular season. The New York Giants franchise was founded in 1925. The Giants have played for nineteen NFL Championships and have won eight, including four of the five Super Bowls in which they have played.



A

Bobby Abrams
Ed Adamchik
George Adams
O'Neal Adams
Titus Adams
Verlin Adams
Ben Agajanian
Ray Agnew
Bill Albright
Steve Alexakos
Brent Alexander
Doc Alexander
John Alexander
Kevin Alexander
Brian Alford
Jay Alford
Raul Allegre
Derek Allen
Ian Allen
Kenderick Allen
Matt Allen
Will Allen
Neely Allison
Beau Almodobar
John Amberg
Bob Anderson
Bruce Anderson
Cliff Anderson
Morten Andersen
Ottis Anderson
Roger Anderson
Winnie Anderson
Winston Anderson
Prince Amukamara
Ben Apuna
Troy Archer
Billy Ard
Jessie Armstead
LaVar Arrington
Corrie Artman
Cliff Ashburn
Pete Athas
Jess Atkinson
John Atwood
Bill Austin
Charles Avedisian
Ken Avery
Clarence Avinger
Adrian Awasom
Kole Ayi

B

Morris Badgro
Matt Bahr
Carlton Bailey
Ed Baker
John Baker
Jon Baker
Stephen Baker
Rich Baldinger
Gary Ballman
Carl Banks
Willie Banks
Tiki Barber
Elmer Barbour
Ramses Barden
Carl Barisich
Hubert Barker
Saquon Barkley
Charles Barnard
Erich Barnes
Len Barnum
Emmett Barrett
Mike Barrow
Al Barry
Fritz Barzilauskas
John Bauer
Mark Bavaro
Willie Beamon
Ray Beck
Brad Beckman
Odell Beckham Jr.
Al Bedner
Keith Beebe
Earl Beecham
Larry Beil
Kevin Belcher
Gordon Bell
Jason Bell
Kay Bell
Marcus Bell
Bob Bellinger
Harry Benkert
Fred Benners
Lewis Bennett
Sean Bennett
Brad Benson
George Benyola
Ralph Berkowitz
Wayne Berry
Bill Berthusen
Fred Besana
Art Best
Riley Biggs
Joe Biscaha
Greg Bishop
Ryan Bishop
Mike Black
Chase Blackburn
Kory Blackwell
Cary Blanchard
Tom Blanchard
Tony Blazine
Al Bloodgood
Tony Blount
Al Blozis
Jim Blumenstock
Ron Blye
Chris Bober
Rex Boggan
Reed Bohovich
Bookie Bolin
Don Boll
Lynn Bomar
Rik Bonness
Johnny Bookman
Kevin Boothe
John Booty
Dennis Borcky
Les Borden
Kevin Boss
McKinley Boston
Jim Bowdoin
Steve Bowman
Bill Boyle
M. L. Brackett
Ahmad Bradshaw
Larry Brahm
John Brandes
Steve Brannon
Chad Bratzke
Matt Brennan
Al Brenner
Leon Bright
Lamont Brightful
Marion Broadstone
Barrett Brooks
Bobby Brooks
Michael Brooks
Fred Brossard
Casimir Brovarney
Barry Brown
Boyd Brown
Dave Brown
Dave A. Brown
Derek Brown
Gary Brown
Lomas Brown
Otto Brown
Ralph Brown
Roger Brown
Rosey Brown
Greg Browning
Scott Brunner
Bill Bryant
Matt Bryant
Will Buchanon
Curtis Buckley
Marcus Buckley
Terrell Buckley
Ted Bucklin
Bart Buetow
Harry Buffington
Maury Buford
Danny Buggs
Jarrod Bunch
Mike Bundra
Charlie Burgess
Rodney Burgess
Jeremy Burkett
Dale Burnett
Hal Burnine
Curry Burns
Plaxico Burress
Jim Burt
Mike Busch
Carl Butkus
James Butler
Skip Butler
Rich Buzin
Ken Byers
Joe Byler
Boris Byrd

C

Chris Cagle
Alan Caldwell
Bruce Caldwell
Len Calligaro
Carter Campbell
Chris Calloway
Dan Campbell
Glenn Campbell
Jesse Campbell
Billy Campfield
Phil Cancik
John Cannady
John Cannella
Leo Cantor
Roland Caranci
Art Carney
Brian Carpenter
Rob Carpenter
Henry Carr
Reggie Carr
Russ Carroccio
Jim Carroll
Vic Carroll
Harry Carson
Scott Carter
Tim Carter
Maurice Carthon
Pete Case
Matt Cavanaugh
Les Caywood
Frank Cephous
Gene Ceppetelli
Don Chandler
Karl Chandler
Ike Charlton
Clifford Chatman
Mike Cherry
George Cheverko
John Chickerneo
O. J. Childress
Clarence Childs
Todd Christensen
Steve Christie
Mike Ciccolella
Jim Clack
Chris Claiborne
Kendrick Clancy
Bob Clatterbuck
Randy Clay
Roy Clay
Harvey Clayton
Vince Clements
Lloyd Clemons
Mike Cloud
Don Clune
Ray Coates
R. J. Cobbs
Junior Coffey
Barry Cofield
Rondy Colbert
Pete Cole
Charles Coleman
Jake Colhouer
Jim Collier
Kerry Collins
Landon Collins
Mark Collins
Ray Collins
Doug Colman
Jim Colvin
Greg Comella
Rudy Comstock
Glen Condren
Charlie Conerly
John Contoulis
Brett Conway
Charles Cook
Johnie Cooks
Joe Cooper
Frank Cope
Gus Coppens
Lou Cordileone
Charles Corgan
José Cortéz
Lester Corzine
Tom Costello
Vince Costello
Tex Coulter
Keith Council
John Counts
Terry Cousin
Brad Cousino
Jamie Covington
Greg Cox
Dennis Crane
Bill Crawford
Ed Crawford
Keith Crawford
Bob Crespino
Chuck Crist
Jim Crocicchia
Mike Croel
Steve Crosby
Howard Cross
Lindon Crow
Tommy Crutcher
Victor Cruz
Larry Csonka
Ward Cuff
Jim Culbreath
Val Culwell
Mack Cummings
Jerome Cunningham
Bill Currier

D

Craig Dahl
Brad Daluiso
Francis Damiani
Joe Danelo
Kenny Daniel
Ed Danowski
Orleans Darkwa
Charles Davis
Chris Davis
Don Davis
Gains Davis
Henry Davis
Jawill Davis
Kelvin Davis
Paul Davis
Roger Davis
Roosevelt Davis
Russell Davis
Scott Davis
Thabiti Davis
Tyrone Davis
Joe Dawkins
Lawrence Dawsey
Ron Dayne
Randy Dean
Lou DeFilippo
Jim DelGaizo
John Dell Isola
Curtis Deloatch
Will Demps
Jerry Dennerlein
Vince Dennery
Mike Dennis
Burnell Dent
Steve DeOssie
Zak DeOssie
Al DeRogatis
Dan DeRose
Darrell Dess
David Diehl
Stacey Dillard
Darnell Dinkins
Fred DiRenzo
Bob DiRico
Al Dixon
Ron Dixon
Zachary Dixon
Bob Dobelstein
Kevin Dockery
Keith Doggert
Jack Doolan
Dan Doornink
Derek Dorris
Dewayne Douglas
Eric Dorsey
John Douglas
Omar Douglas
Robert Douglas
Maurice Douglass
Paul Douglass
Ed Dove
Gary Downs
Reuben Droughns
Fred Dryer
Tom Dublinski
Maurice Dubofsky
Walt Dubzinski
Mark Duckens
Damane Duckett
Dick Duden
Paul Dudley
Dave Duerson
Jamal Duff
Bill Dugan
Leonard Dugan
Gilford Duggan
Bobby Duhon
Dave Dunaway
Jim Duncan
Bob Dunlap
Jonathan Dunn
Rick Dvorak

E

Kay Eakin
Lou Eaton
Scott Eaton
Keith Eck
Floyd Eddings
Antonio Edwards
Bill Edwards
Steve Edwards
Keith Elias
Bill Ellenbogen
Russell Ellington
John Elliott
Mark Ellison
Percy Ellsworth
Carlos Emmons
Dick Enderle
Derek Engler
Bobby Epps
Issac Epps
Bill Erickson
Len Eshmont
Don Ettinger
Charlie Evans
Willie Evans

F

Art Faircloth
Nello Falaschi
Terry Falcon
Jeff Feagles
Tiny Feather
Jay Feely
Eric Felton
Carl Fennema
Frank Ferrara
Diamond Ferri
Joe Fields
Frank Filchock
Jim Files
Steve Filipowicz
Gene Filipski
Jim Finn
Cletus Fischer
Mike Fitzgerald
Ray Flaherty
Max Flenniken
Ereck Flowers
Larry Flowers
Richmond Flowers
Tom Flynn
Mark Flythe
Steve Folsom
Chris Foote
Charlie Ford
Jay Foreman
Ike Forte
Dan Fowler
Mike Fox
Samuel Fox
George Franck
Ike Frankian
George Franklin
Tucker Frederickson
Lorenzo Freeman
Mike Friede
Benny Friedman
Byron Frisch
Jim Frugone
John Fuqua

G

Bobby Gaiters
Stan Galazin
Tony Galbreath
Arnold Galiffa
Dave Gallagher
Scott Galyon
Jim Garcia
Bob Garner
Sam Garnes
Alvin Garrett
Curtis Garrett
Jason Garrett
Art Garvey
Mike Garzoni
Tom Gatewood
Bruce Gehrke
Charles Gelatka
Mike Gibbons
Robert Giblin
Denver Gibson
Frank Gifford
Johnny Gildea
Larry Gillard
Walker Gillette
Darnell Gilliard
Chet Gladchuk
Chip Glass
Vencie Glenn
Rich Glover
Chris Godfrey
Jim Goff
Pete Gogolak
Dan Goich
Jack Golden
Wen Goldsmith
Jerry Golsteyn
Conrad Goode
Tod Goodwin
Pete Gorgone
Paul Governali
Scott Gragg
Kent Graham
Ev Grandelius
Len Grant
Ryan Grant
Carl Grate
Gordon Gravelle
Carlton Gray
Earnest Gray
Barrett Green
Joe Green
Tony Green
A J. Greene
Bob Greenhalgh
Jack Gregory
Rosey Grier
Nick Greisen
Cornelius Griffin
Glynn Griffing
Forrest Griffith
Cecil Grigg
Bob Grim
Andy Gross
Lee Grosscup
Neal Guggemos
Ralph Guglielmi
Jimmy Gunn
Marquies Gunn
Al Gursky
Leroy Gutowsky
Buzz Guy
Lou Guy
Joe Guyon
Myron Guyton

H

Andy Haase
Bill Hachten
Wayne Haddix
John Haden
John Hagerty
Henry Haines
Ali Haji-Sheikh
Ryan Hale
Harald Hall
John Hall
Pete Hall
Conrad Hamilton
Keith Hamilton
Bobby Hammond
Rodney Hampton
Norman Hand
Ray Hanken
Herb Hannah
Dick Hanson
Merle Hapes
Dee Hardison
Cecil Hare
Art Harms
Charlie Harper
LaSalle Harper
Gary Harrell
Don Harris
Johnnie Harris
Oliver Harris
Phil Harris
Robert Harris
Wendell Harris
Max Harrison
Harold Hart
Howard Hartzog
George Hasenohrl
Don Hasselbeck
Tim Hasselbeck
Dave Hathcock
Art Hauser
Larry Hayes
Mark Haynes
Matt Hazeltine
Andy Headen
Joe Heap
Larry Heater
Bud Hebert
Ralph Heck
Madison Hedgecock
Brody Heffner-Liddlard
Mel Hein
Don Heinrich
Dutch Hendrian
Steve Henry
Wilbur "Pete" Henry
Dick Hensley
Arnie Herber
Johnny Hermann
Don Herrmann
Ray Hickl
Eddie Hicks
John Hicks
Ed Hiemstra
Cowboy Hill
John Hill
Kenny Hill
Ralph Hill
Jerry Hillebrand
Ike Hilliard
Hal Hilpirt
Roy Hilton
Jack Hinkle
Chuck Hinton
Nate Hobgood-Chittick
Merwin Hodel
Mike Hogan
Paul Hogan
Jimmy Holifield
Vernon Holland
John Holman
Jaret Holmes
Kenny Holmes
Bernard Holsey
Tam Hopkins
Mike Horan
Richard Horne
Sam Horner
Ron Hornsby
Jeff Hostetler
Dick Houston
John Hovious
Anthony Howard
Dosey Howard
Erik Howard
Red Howard
Jim Lee Howell
Lane Howell
Cal Hubbard
Bob Hudson
Sam Huff
Keith Hugger
Ed Hughes
Ernie Hughes
Pat Hughes
Cedric Humes
Byron Hunt
George Hunt
Bill Hutchinson
Ralph Hutchinson
Gerry Huth
Bob Hyland
Henry Hynoski

I

Talma Imlay
Mark Ingram Sr.
Cecil Irvin
Chris Iverson

J

Bob Jackson
Cleveland Jackson
Greg Jackson
Honor Jackson
Louis Jackson
Mark Jackson
Terry Jackson
Allen Jacobs
Brandon Jacobs
Proverb Jacobs
Larry Jacobson
Dick James
Charlie Janarette
Paul Jappe
Jon Jelacic
Ed Jenkins
Izel Jenkins
Dave Jennings
Michael Jennings
Brandon Jessie
Gary Jeter
Dwayne Jiles
Bill Johnson
Bobby Johnson
Curley Johnson
Damian Johnson
Darcy Johnson
Dennis Johnson
Dwight Johnson
Gene Johnson
Herb Johnson
Joe Johnson
John Johnson
Ken Johnson
Larry Johnson
Len Johnson
LeShon Johnson
Michael Johnson
Nate Johnson
Pepper Johnson
Randy Johnson
Ron Johnson
Bob Jones
Brian Johnston
Cedric Jones
Chris Jones
Clarence Jones
Daniel Jones
Daryl Jones
Dhani Jones
Ernie Jones
Homer Jones
Mark Jones
Robbie Jones
Tom Jones
David Jordan
William Joseph
Delvin Joyce
Trey Junkin
Joe Jurevicius

K

Vyto Kab
Herb Kane
Danny Kanell
Jim Kanicki
Bernie Kaplan
John Karcis
Carl Karilivacz
Jim Katcavage
Thom Kaumeyer
Eulis Keahy
Tom Kearns
Brian Kelley
Ellison Kelly
Shipwreck Kelly
Paul Kelly
Jim Kendrick
George Kennard
Tom Kennedy
William C. Kenyon
George Kershaw
Ken Keuper
Glenn Killinger
Charlie Killett
Bruce Kimball
Bill Kimber
Jerry Kimmel
Terry Kinard
Gordon King
Jerome King
Phil King
Carl Kinscherf
John Kirby
Lou Kirouac
Johnny Kitzmiller
Mathias Kiwanuka
Al Klasoskus
Harry Kline
Mike Klotovich
Pat Knight
Milt Kobrosky
Adam Koets
Ed Kolman
Ross Kolodziej
Joe Koontz
Walter Koppisch
Doug Kotar
Rich Kotite
Ernie Koy, Jr.
Brian Kozlowski
Jim Krahl
Matt Kranchick
Bob Kratch
Max Krause
Ray Krouse
Ryan Kuehl
Troy Kyles

L

Bob Lacey
Chester Lagod
Scott Laidlaw
Roland Lakes
Roger Lalonde
Sean Landeta
Tom Landry
Eric Lane
Gary Lane
Granville Lansdell
Myron Lapka
Greg Larson
John Lascari
Greg Lasker
Frank Lasky
Dick Lasse
Dick Leavitt
Clarence LeBlanc
Edgar Lechner
Tuffy Leemans
Lance Legree
Matt Lentz
Jim Leo
Bashir Levingston
Art Lewis
Danny Lewis
Kevin Lewis
Thomas Lewis
Frank Liebel
Don Lieberum
Jeremy Lincoln
Virgil Lindahl
Gabe Lindstrom
Chris Linnin
Jim Little
Cliff Livingston
Howard Livingston
Dan Lloyd
Carl "Spider" Lockhart
Buford Long
Tom Longo
Joe Don Looney
Jared Lorenzen
Billy Lott
Walter Love
Edwin Lovelady
John LoVetere
Frank LoVuolo
Wayne Lucier
Jack Lummus
Ron Lumpkin
Ken Lunday
Bob Lurtsema
Dick Lynch
Babe Lyon

M

Ken MacAfee
Buck MacDonald
Phillip Mack
John Mackorell
Bill Mackrides
Tommy Maddox
Sam Madison
Bruce Maher
Wesly Mallard
Larry Mallory
Ray Mallouf
Pete Mangum
Eli Manning
Mario Manningham
Tillie Manton
Lionel Manuel
Andy Marefos
Frank Marion
Cliff Marker
Dale Markham
Sal Marone
Dusan Maronic
Dick Marsh
Arthur Marshall
Ed Marshall
Leonard Marshall
Frank Martin
George Martin
John Martinkovic
Robert Massey
John Mastrangelo
Bill Matan
Billy Matthews
Michael Matthews
Bo Matthews
Chris Maumalanga
Alvin Maxson
Jim Maxwell
Brad Maynard
Don Maynard
Mike Mayock
Ed Mazurek
Jack McBride
Don McCafferty
Ed McCaffrey
Jim McCann
Tim McCann
Phil McConkey
Mike McCoy
Bob McChesney
Clint McClain
Loaird McCreary
Emmanuel McDaniel
LeCharls McDaniel
Ramos McDonald
Brady McDonnell
John McDowell
Hugh McElhenny
Paul McFadden
Ed McGee
Tony McGee
Kanavis McGhee
Ed McGinley
Ed McGlasson
Reggie McGowan
Lawrence McGrew
Curtis McGriff
Lamar McGriggs
Kareem McKenzie
Odis McKinney
Joe McLaughlin
John McLaughry
Ron McLean
Dan McMullen
Typail McMullen
Clifton McNeil
R. W. McQuarters
Leon McQuay
Bennie McRae
Jack Mead
David Meggett
Greg Meisner
John Mellus
Don Menasco
John Mendenhall
Hartwell Menefee
Chuck Mercein
Jim Mercer
Casey Merrill
Bernie Mertes
Max Messner
Ed Micklovic
Saul Mielziner
Bill Miklich
Ron Mikolajczyk
Leo Miles
Calvin Miller
Corey Miller
Ed Miller
Jim Miller
Mike Miller
Solomon Miller
James Milling
Jeff Mills
Bill Milner
Martrez Milner
Century Milstead
Skip Minisi
Randy Minniear
Bob Mischak
John Mistler
Grandville Mitchell
Hal Mitchell
Kawika Mitchell
Pete Mitchell
Russell Mitchell
Matt Mitrione
Anthony Mix
David Moa
Dick Modzelewski
Frank Molden
John Molenda
Quincy Monk
Joe Montgomery
Pete Monty
Dana Moore
Eric Moore (OL)
Eric Moore (DL)
Henry Moore
Herman Moore
Ken Moore
Emery Moorehead
Dale Moran
Hap Moran
Jim Moran
Tom Moran
Bill Morgan
Dan Morgan
Eddie Morgan (defensive tackle)
Earl Morrall
Joe Morris
Robert Morris
Joe Morrison
Pat Morrison
Bob Morrow
Chad Morton
Craig Morton
Sinorice Moss
Kelly Mote
Zeke Mowatt
Bob Mrosko
Tom Mullady
Tom Mullen
Lee Mulleneaux
Noah Mullins
George Munday
Lyle Munn
Les Murdock
Earl Murray
George Murtagh
Brandon Myers
Tommy Myers
Toby Myles

N

Bob Nash
Bill Neill
Jim Neill
Andy Nelson
Karl Nelson
Al Nesser
Doug Nettles
Tom Neville
Harry Newman
Frank Nicholson
Steve Nicholson
Walter Nielsen
Hakeem Nicks
Jerry Niles
Björn Nittmo
Emery Nix
Dick Nolan
John Norby
Harry Nordstrom
Jimmy Norris
Jim Norton
Harry Nutts

O

Dave O'Brien
Shaun O'Hara
Dan O'Leary
Bart Oates
Roman Oben
Jim Obradovich
Steve Odom
Cory Ohnesorge
Cliff Olander
Doug Oldershaw
Ray Oldham
Joe Orduna
Raheem Orr
Jim Ostendarp
Alton Owen
Steve Owen
Tom Owen
William Owen
R.C. Owens

P

Lou Palazzi
Lonnie Palelei
Mike Palm
Jesse Palmer
Kaulana Park
Frank Parker
Glenn Parker
Jeremiah Parker
Ken Parker
Preston Parker
Fred Parnell
Owen Parry
Bill Paschal
Gordon Paschka
Bear Pascoe
DeWayne Patmon
David Patten
Don Patterson
Elvis Patterson
Mike Patterson
Robert Patton
Jimmy Patton
Francis Peay
Winifield Pedersen
Erric Pegram
Ray Pelfrey
Willard Perdue
Mike Perez
Johnny Perkins
Ralph Perretta
Leon Perry
Dick Pesonen
Christian Peter
Marty Peterson
William Peterson
Luke Petitgout
William Petrilas
Gary Pettigrew
Bob Peviani
Ewell Phillips
Ryan Phillips
Bill Piccolo
Aaron Pierce
Antonio Pierce
Al Pierotti
Jason Pierre-Paul
Jim Pietrzak
Joyce Pipkin
Joe Pisarcik
Danny Pittman
Tony Plansky
Milt Plum
Owen Pochman
Willie Ponder
Barney Poole
Jim Poole
Ray Poole
Geoffrey Pope
Rob Porter
Bobby Post
Earl Potteiger
Ernie Pough
Andre Powell
Dick Powell
Clyde Powers
Jim Prestel
Eddie Price
Dominic Principe
Bosh Pritchard
Steve Pritko
Joe Prokop
Marion Pugh
Alfred Pupunu

Q

Jess Quatse

R

Dave Rader
Phil Ragazzo
Joe Ramona
Rod Randle
Rueben Randle
Thomas Randolph
John Rapacz
Kenyon Rasheed
Corey Raymond
Frank Reagan
Gary Reasons
Beasley Reece
Henry Reed
Mark Reed
Max Reed
Smith Reed
Darren Reese
Henry Reese
Moses Regular
Steve Rehage
Tom Rehder
Milt Rehnquist
Edwin Reihert
Ed Reynolds
Jerry Reynolds
Owen Reynolds
Ray Rhodes
Orian Earl Rice
Herb Rich
Elvin "Kink" Richards
Eddie D Richardson
Tim Richardson
Doug Riesenberg
Lee Riley
Marcellus Rivers
Nate Rivers
Philip Rivers
Jack Rizzo
Fred Robbins
Brian Roberson
Gene Roberts
Tom Roberts
William Roberts
Jimmy Robinson
Stacy Robinson
Andy Robustelli
Ruben Rodriguez
Jeff Roehl
Johnny Roland
Dave Roller
George Roman
Bill Rooney
Rudy Rosatti
Gene Rose
Mike Rosenthal
Aaron Ross
Kyle Rote
Lee Rouson
Tony Rovinski
Harmon Rowe
Ed Royston
Reggie Rucker
Coleman Rudolph
Grey Ruegamer
Lafayette "Reb" Russell
Jeff Rutledge

S

Kelly Saalfeld
Jerome Sally
John Salscheider
John Sanchez
Brandon Sanders
Tony Sarausky
Harvey Sark
Ollie Satenstein
Brian Saxton
Dwight Scales
Babe Scheuer
Henry Schichtle
Bob Schmidt
Bob Schmit
Bob Schnelker
Otto Schnellbacher
Bob Scholtz
Adam Schreiber
Eric Schubert
Paul Schuette
Bill Schuler
Ray Schwab
Cedric Scott
George Scott
Joe Scott
Lance Scott
Malcolm Scott
Tom Scott
Stan Sczurek
Jonas Seawright
Len Sedbrook
Jason Sehorn
Earl Seick
Warren Seitz
Andy Selfridge
Rich Seubert
Kato Serwanga
Leland Shaffer
George Shaw
Pete Shaw
Ricky Shaw
Jerry Shay
Ed Shedlosky
Mike Sherrard
Horace "Bud" Sherrod
Tim Sherwin
Visanthe Shiancoe
Dick Shiner
Bill Shipp
Gary Shirk
Jeremy Shockey
Del Shofner
Brandon Short
Pete Shufelt
Les Shy
Jules Siegle
Sam Silas
Roy Simmons
Tony Simmons
Bob Simms
Phil Simms
Dave Simonson
Al Simpson
James Sims
Walter Singer
Bill Singletary
John Sinnott
Brian Sisley
Jim Sivell
Leo Skladany
John Skorupan
Lou Slaby
Darius Slayton
Eldridge Small
George Small
Doug Smith
Jeff Smith (LB)
Jeff Smith (TE)
Joey Smith
Lance Smith
Omar Smith
Steve Smith
Torin Smith
Willis Smith
Zeke Smith
Norm Snead
Chris Snee
Gerry Snyder
Hank Soar
Ben Sohn
Herbert "Tiny" Solomon
Phillippi Sparks
Willie Spencer
Jack Spinks
Harold Springer
Charles Stackhouse
Harrison Stafford
Dick Stahlman
Randy Staten
Sam Stein
Al Steinfeld
Paul Stenn
Reggie Stephens
Art Stevenson
Jim Stienke
Bill Stits
Tim Stokes
Bryan Stoltenberg
Michael Stone
Ron Stone
Omar Stoutmire
John Strada
Michael Strahan
Bill Stribling
Ken Strong
Jack Stroud
Henry Stuckey
Andy Stynchula
Joe Sulaitis
Marques Sullivan
Pat Summerall
Carl Summerell
Don Sutherin
Ed Sutton
Frank Sutton
Harland Svare
Bill Svoboda
Bill Swain
Gregg Swartwoudt
Bill Swiacki
Joe Szczecko

T

Phil Tabor
Joe Taffoni
Joe Taibi
Ben Talley
Fran Tarkenton
Bob Tarrant
Matt Tarullo
David Tate
Golden Tate
John Tate
John Tautolo
Billy Taylor
Bob Taylor
Jamaar Taylor
Lawrence Taylor
Tommy Thigpen
Aaron Thomas
Bob Thomas
Dave Thomas
George Thomas
Mark Thomas
Tre Thomas
Chris Thome
James Thompson
Reyna Thompson
Rocky Thompson
Warren Thompson
George Thornton
Jim Thorpe
Steve Thurlow
Travis Tidwell
Leo Tierney
Lewis Tillman
Bob Timberlake
Dave Tipton
Y. A. Tittle
George Tobin
Steve Tobin
Army Tomaini
Carl Tomasello
Tom Tomlin
Amani Toomer
Jeff Tootle
Bob Topp
Reggie Torbor
Bob Torrey
John Treadaway
David Treadwell
Bill Triplett
Mel Triplett
Bob Trocolor
Justin Tuck
Bob Tucker
John Tuggle
Emlen Tunnell
Francis Turbert
J. T. Turner
Kevin Turner
Odessa Turner
Orville Tuttle
Maurice Tyler
Lawrence Tynes
David Tyree

U

Osi Umenyiora
Rich Umphrey
E. J. Underwood
Scott Urch

V

Doug Van Horn
Brad Van Pelt
Olivier Vernon
Vanoy Vernon
Michael Varajon
Larry Vargo
Larry Visnic
Otto Vokaty
Rick Volk
Don Vosberg
Tillie Voss

W

Carl Wafer
Lyman Walbridge
Craig Walendy
Frank Walker
Herschel Walker
Mickey Walker
Paul Walker
Robert (Bill) Walls
Everson Walls
Joe Walton
Wayne Walton
Whip Walton
Derrick Ward
Kurt Warner
Vince Warren
Damon Washington
Gene Washington
John Washington
Keith Washington
Larry Watkins
Tim Watson
Darius Watts
Ted Watts
Charles Way
Andre Weathers
Larrye Weaver
Allen Webb
Dutch Webber
Alex Webster
Corey Webster
Arnie Weinmeister
Eric Weir
Ed Weisacosky
John Weiss
Herb Welch
Joe Wellborn
Joel Wells
Kent Wells
Mike Wells
Cecil Wesley
Lyle West
Stan West
Jeff Weston
Tyrone Wheatley
Ernie Wheelwright
Guy Whimper
Adrian White
Art White
Clayton White
Freeman White
Jim White
Marsh White
Phil White
Robb White
Sheldon White
Bob Whitfield
David Whitmore
Mike Whittington
Jason Whittle
Ossie Wiberg
Corey Widmer
Ed Widseth
Ray Wietecha
Dick Wilkins
Bob Wilkinson
Gerris Wilkinson
Andre Williams
Brian Williams
Byron Williams
Davern Williams
Ellery Williams
Frank Williams
George Williams
Harry Williams
Jarvis Williams
Joe Williams
Perry Williams
Rodney Williams
Shaun Williams
Van Williams
Willie Williams
Ernie Williamson
Ken Willis
Butch Wilson
Fay Wilson
Gibril Wilson
Gillis Wilson
Bill Windauer
Brandon Winey
Jason Winrow
Bill Winter
Frank Winters
Hugh Wolfe
Gary Wood
Dick Woodard
Butch Woolfolk
Gary Woolford
Tito Wooten
Roscoe Word
Harry Workman
Joe Wostoupal
Adam Wright
Anthony Wright
Manuel Wright
Steve Wright
Kervin Wyatt
Doug Wycoff
Harry Wynne

Y

James Yarbrough
Howard Yeager
Todd Yeaman
Dick Yelvington
Len Younce
Dave Young
Rodney Young
Willie Young
Frank Youso
Walt Yowarsky

Z

Joe Zapustas
Rob Zatechka
Dusty Zeigler
Coleman Zeno
Chris Zieman
Mickey Zofko
Jim Zyntell

References

 

 
New York G
players